Smedes is a surname. Notable people with the surname include:

Lewis B. Smedes (1921–2002), American Christian author, ethicist, and theologian
Susan Dabney Smedes (1840–1913), American teacher, news correspondent, and author
Taede A. Smedes (born 1973), Dutch philosopher of religion